Nippur de Lagash is an Argentine historical comic series, published between 1967 and 1998. It is set in the 23rd century BC (according to the short chronology), about a fictional homonym warrior of Sumer, created by Paraguayan comic scriptwriter Robin Wood, and illustrated by Argentine artist Lucho Olivera. It was published by Columba Publishing in the magazine D'Artagnan and later Nippur Magnum comic books from 1967 to 1998, and is considered one of the most important Argentine comics.

Some of the authors and artists who worked on this comic are, among many, Sergio Mulko, Néstor Barrón, Gustavo Amézaga, Ricardo Villagrán and Jorge Zaffino.

Plot summary 
The protagonist's parents name him after the ancient city of Nippur, where they were born. He later gained the epithet "from Lagash" after leaving his home city, Lagash, in forced exile.

Nippur's adventures, loosely framed on actual Ancient History, start when he is a general and military leader of Lagash, who is forced to escape from Mesopotamia after an invasion carried out by the tyrant Lugal-Zage-Si. Nippur then wanders around the Bronze Age known world, the Middle East and east Mediterranean. He makes friends and enemies, acquires enormous fame, first as "The Errant One" and then as "The Incorruptible", fights many battles and loses one eye.

After some years of living the life of a farmer and raising his son, the wild archer Hiras, Nippur eventually decides to take up the sword once more: he and his allies take part on the Akkadian conquest of the Fertile Crescent. Thus does Nippur become king of Lagash, but after some time he chooses to abdicate and resumes his travels for the rest of his life.

References

External links 
 White Walls - Unofficial Nippur de Lagash's Website Blancas Murallas at Wayback Machine 

Argentine comic strips
1967 comics debuts
1998 comics endings
Fictional Iraqi people
Male characters in comics
Fictional generals
Fictional kings
Comics characters introduced in 1967
Comics set in ancient Mesopotamia
Comics set in ancient Persia
Comics set in ancient Egypt
Comics set in ancient Israel
23rd century BC